Koth or KOTH may refer to:

 Koth, Ahmedabad, a village in the Ahmadabad district of Gujarat, India
 Koth, Ballia, a village in the Ballia district of Uttar Pradesh, India
 Koth (Conan),  a nation in the fictional world of Conan the Barbarian
 King of the Hill (disambiguation), colloquial abbreviation used by players of the game and many fans of the popular FOX animated TV series
 Southwest Oregon Regional Airport (ICAO code: KOTH), a public airport located in the city of North Bend, in Coos County, Oregon, USA
 The German soprano Erika Köth
 Koth of the Hammer, a planeswalker in the collectible card game Magic: The Gathering
 Sign of Koth, an element of the Cthulhu Mythos
 Janet Koth, American reality show contestant